Jennie Elizabeth Eisenhower (born August 15, 1978) is an American actress and director. Eisenhower has performed in theater productions Off-Broadway and in regional theatre, being nominated for seven Barrymore Awards and winning two of them. She has played minor roles in several feature films. She is a great-granddaughter of Dwight D. Eisenhower and granddaughter of Richard Nixon, both presidents of the United States.

Early life
Eisenhower was born in San Clemente, California, to Julie Nixon Eisenhower and David Eisenhower. Her maternal grandparents were U.S. President Richard Nixon and First Lady Pat Nixon, while her paternal great-grandparents were U.S. President Dwight D. Eisenhower and First Lady Mamie Eisenhower. She spent her childhood in Valley Forge, Pennsylvania, and graduated summa cum laude from Northwestern University in Evanston, Illinois. She has one brother, Alex Richard Eisenhower (b. 1980), and one sister, Melanie Catherine Eisenhower (b. 1984).

In 1996, Jennie Eisenhower was presented as a debutante to high society at the International Debutante Ball at the Waldorf Astoria Hotel in New York City.

Career
Eisenhower has performed in Off-Broadway productions and at regional theaters across the United States. For her performances in Philadelphia, Pennsylvania, she has won two Barrymore Awards: Best Actress in a Musical (2009) for Forbidden Broadway's Greatest Hits, and Best Supporting Actress in a Musical (2004) for The Wild Party. She has also been nominated for Barrymore Awards for her work in Show Boat at the Media Theatre (2010), The 25th Annual Putnam County Spelling Bee at Theatre Horizon in Norristown (2011), Little Women at Bristol Riverside Theatre (2011), A Grand Night for Singing at the Walnut Street Theatre (2012), Parade at the Arden Theatre (2013), and Bullets Over Broadway (2018). 

Other appearances have included Passion at the Arden Theatre Company (2015), Kiss Me, Kate at the Act II Playhouse (2016), and  Arsenic and Old Lace (2014), The Humans (2018) and The Best Man (2020) at the Walnut Street Theatre, where she has also directed several productions; Off-Broadway appearances include "Suburb" at York Theatre. Elsewhere in the greater Philadelphia region, Eisenhower directed 1776 in 2016 and Falsettos in 2019, among other works.

Eisenhower has appeared in small roles in the films Mona Lisa Smile (2003), Arthur (2011), and The Suspect (2013). She taught theatre as an adjunct faculty member at Temple University.

Personal life
Eisenhower narrated the audiobook version of her mother’s 2007 book about her grandmother, Pat Nixon: The Untold Story. She is a Democrat and voted for Barack Obama in 2012.

Filmography
 Mona Lisa Smile (2003) – Girl at the Station
 Head Space (2006) – TV Correspondent
 Arthur (2011) – Alexis
 The Suspect (2013) – Instructor
 Dispatches From Elsewhere (2020) – Elsewhereian #2
 Law & Order (2022) – Denise Cohen

References

External links

Jennie Eisenhower Website
National Herald Archive feature
Playbill photo feature

1978 births
Living people
20th-century American actresses
21st-century American actresses
People from San Clemente, California
American film actresses
American stage actresses
Eisenhower family
Nixon family
Northwestern University School of Communication alumni
Actresses from California
Actresses from Philadelphia
Bisexual actresses
LGBT people from California
Debutantes of the International Debutante Ball
American LGBT actors
Writers from California
American debutantes